Germania Wine Cellars, or Olde Germania Wine Cellars, is a historic winery complex and national historic district located at Hammondsport in Steuben County, New York. The complex was built in nine sections between 1881 and 1902. The majority of the buildings are built of local stone, portions of which are coated in stucco.  The complex is currently used for barrel storage.

It was listed on the National Register of Historic Places in 2000.

References

Wineries in New York (state)
Agricultural buildings and structures on the National Register of Historic Places in New York (state)
Agricultural buildings and structures on the National Register of Historic Places
Historic districts on the National Register of Historic Places in New York (state)
Industrial buildings completed in 1902
Buildings and structures in Steuben County, New York
Second Empire architecture in New York (state)
Italianate architecture in New York (state)
National Register of Historic Places in Steuben County, New York